Kentucky Route 914 (KY 914) is a highway in Somerset, Kentucky that encircles the city of Somerset.

Route description
KY 914 begins at an interchange with the Cumberland Parkway northwest of downtown Somerset in Pulaski County, heading south as a four-lane divided highway. Most of the highway is within the city limits of Somerset due to annexations made by city government. The road passes through farm fields and comes to an intersection with KY 80/KY 6014. Here, KY 80 turns south to form a concurrency with KY 914, and the two routes head through a mix of farmland and woodland with some development. KY 80 splits to the west and KY 914 continues south-southeast through agricultural areas. The road intersects the southern terminus of KY 3261 and passes between residential areas to the west and farmland to the east prior to crossing KY 1577. The route passes through more agricultural areas with some nearby development and reaches a junction with KY 1642. At this point, KY 914 curves east and heads into business areas, intersecting U.S. Route 27 (US 27) in one of the few portions of the route not within Somerset city limits.

The road continues past commercial development and heads northeast into farmland, intersecting the eastern terminus of KY 1642. The route continues into a mix of farm fields, woods, and industrial development, where it intersects the southern terminus of KY 3057 and the northern terminus of former KY 2747. KY 914 comes to a bridge over a Norfolk Southern railroad line and crosses into the city limits of Ferguson and intersects KY 1247. The road passes through wooded areas with some fields and reaches the junction with KY 769 / Rush Branch Road. Following this, the road curves north before heading northwest back into Somerset and passing through farm fields and crossing KY 192. KY 914 continues northwest to its eastern terminus at KY 80 / Hal Rogers Parkway.

Major intersections

References

External links

0914
0914